The following species in the flowering plant genus Primula, often called primroses and cowslips, are accepted by Plants of the World Online. Over 25 books have been written on the genus.

Primula × admontensis 
Primula advena 
Primula aemula 
Primula aerinantha 
Primula afghanica 
Primula agleniana 
Primula albenensis 
Primula alcalina 
Primula algida 
Primula aliciae 
Primula allionii 
Primula alpicola 
Primula alsophila 
Primula ambita 
Primula amethystina 
Primula amoena 
Primula angustifolia 
Primula anisodora 
Primula annulata 
Primula anthemifolia 
Primula anvilensis 
Primula apennina 
Primula apicicallosa 
Primula aromatica 
Primula arunachalensis 
Primula asarifolia 
Primula assamica 
Primula atrodentata 
Primula aurantiaca 
Primula aureata 
Primula auricula 
Primula auriculata 
Primula austrofrigida 
Primula baileyana 
Primula baldshuanica 
Primula barbatula 
Primula barbicalyx 
Primula bathangensis 
Primula bella 
Primula bellidifolia 
Primula bergenioides 
Primula × berninae 
Primula bhutanica 
Primula biserrata 
Primula blandula 
Primula blattariformis 
Primula blinii 
Primula bomiensis 
Primula × boni-auxilii 
Primula boothii 
Primula borealis 
Primula boreiocalliantha 
Primula botschantzevii 
Primula × bowlesii 
Primula brachystoma 
Primula bracteosa 
Primula bukukunica 
Primula bullata 
Primula bulleyana 
Primula buryana 
Primula caldaria 
Primula calderiana 
Primula calliantha 
Primula calthifolia 
Primula calyptrata 
Primula candicans 
Primula capillaris 
Primula capitata 
Primula capitellata 
Primula cardioeides 
Primula carniolica 
Primula carolinehenryae 
Primula × caruelii 
Primula caulifera 
Primula cavaleriei 
Primula caveana 
Primula cawdoriana 
Primula celsiiformis 
Primula centellifolia 
Primula cerina 
Primula cernua 
Primula chamaedoron 
Primula chamaethauma 
Primula chapaensis 
Primula chartacea 
Primula chasmophila 
Primula chienii 
Primula chimingiana 
Primula chionantha 
Primula chionata 
Primula chionogenes 
Primula chrysochlora 
Primula chrysostoma 
Primula chumbiensis 
Primula chungensis 
Primula cicutariifolia 
Primula cinerascens 
Primula clarkei 
Primula clevelandii 
Primula clusiana 
Primula clutterbuckii 
Primula cockburniana 
Primula coelata 
Primula coerulea 
Primula comata 
Primula comberi 
Primula concholoba 
Primula concinna 
Primula conjugens 
Primula conspersa 
Primula cooperi 
Primula cordifolia 
Primula × coronata 
Primula cortusoides 
Primula coryphaea 
Primula cottia 
Primula crassa 
Primula crassifolia 
Primula crispata 
Primula crocifolia 
Primula cuneifolia 
Primula cunninghamii 
Primula cusickiana 
Primula daonensis 
Primula darialica 
Primula davidii 
Primula davisii 
Primula deflexa 
Primula dejuniana 
Primula densa 
Primula denticulata 
Primula denticuloides 
Primula deorum 
Primula × deschmannii 
Primula deuteronana 
Primula diantha 
Primula dickieana 
Primula dictyophylla 
Primula × digenea 
Primula × discolor 
Primula divaricata 
Primula dongchuanensis 
Primula drummondiana 
Primula dryadifolia 
Primula × dschungdienensis 
Primula duclouxii 
Primula dueckelmannii 
Primula dumicola 
Primula × dumoulinii 
Primula duthieana 
Primula eburnea 
Primula edelbergii 
Primula efarinosa 
Primula effusa 
Primula egaliksensis 
Primula elatior 
Primula × elisabethae 
Primula elizabethiae 
Primula elliptica 
Primula elongata 
Primula epilithica 
Primula epilosa 
Primula erosa 
Primula erratica 
Primula erythrocarpa 
Primula × escheri 
Primula esquirolii 
Primula euchaites 
Primula eugeniae 
Primula euosma 
Primula euprepes 
Primula eximia 
Primula faberi 
Primula × facchinii 
Primula fagosa 
Primula falcifolia 
Primula fangii 
Primula fangingensis 
Primula farinifolia 
Primula farinosa 
Primula farreriana 
Primula fasciculata 
Primula fassettii 
Primula fea 
Primula fedtschenkoi 
Primula fenghwaiana 
Primula fernaldiana 
Primula filchnerae 
Primula filipes 
Primula fimbriata 
Primula firmipes 
Primula fistulosa 
Primula flabellifera 
Primula flaccida 
Primula flagellaris 
Primula flava 
Primula flexuosa 
Primula × floerkeana 
Primula floribunda 
Primula florindae 
Primula fragrans 
Primula frenchii 
Primula frigida 
Primula frondosa 
Primula gambeliana 
Primula garhwalica 
Primula gaubaeana 
Primula gemmifera 
Primula geraniifolia 
Primula geranophylla 
Primula giraldiana 
Primula glabra 
Primula glandulifera 
Primula glaucescens 
Primula glomerata 
Primula glutinosa 
Primula × goebelii 
Primula gracilenta 
Primula gracilipes 
Primula graminifolia 
Primula grandis 
Primula griffithii 
Primula halleri 
Primula handeliana 
Primula hazarica 
Primula × heeri 
Primula helodoxa 
Primula hendersonii 
Primula henrici 
Primula heterochroma 
Primula heucherifolia 
Primula hidakana 
Primula hilaris 
Primula hirsuta 
Primula hoffmanniana 
Primula hoi 
Primula homogama 
Primula hongshanensis 
Primula hookeri 
Primula huashanensis 
Primula hubeiensis 
Primula × hugueninii 
Primula hunanensis 
Primula hydrocotylifolia 
Primula hylobia 
Primula hypoleuca 
Primula ianthina 
Primula iljinskii 
Primula inayatii 
Primula incana 
Primula inopinata 
Primula intanoensis 
Primula integrifolia 
Primula interjacens 
Primula intricata 
Primula involucrata 
Primula ioessa 
Primula irregularis 
Primula jaffreyana 
Primula japonica 
Primula jeffreyi 
Primula jesoana 
Primula jigmediana 
Primula jiugongshanensis 
Primula jucunda 
Primula × judicariensis 
Primula juliae 
Primula × juribella 
Primula kaufmanniana 
Primula kawasimae 
Primula khasiana 
Primula kialensis 
Primula kingii 
Primula kisoana 
Primula kitaibeliana 
Primula klattii 
Primula klaveriana 
Primula knorringiana 
Primula knuthiana 
Primula × kolbeana 
Primula × kraettliana 
Primula kwangtungensis 
Primula kweichouensis 
Primula lacerata 
Primula laciniata 
Primula lactucoides 
Primula latifolia 
Primula latiloba 
Primula latisecta 
Primula laurentiana 
Primula laxiuscula 
Primula × lebliana 
Primula leptophylla 
Primula levicalyx 
Primula lihengiana 
Primula lilacina 
Primula limbata 
Primula listeri 
Primula lithophila 
Primula littledalei 
Primula × loiseleurii 
Primula longipes 
Primula longiscapa 
Primula lungchiensis 
Primula lutea 
Primula luteoflora 
Primula luteola 
Primula macrocarpa 
Primula macrophylla 
Primula magellanica 
Primula malacoides 
Primula mallophylla 
Primula malvacea 
Primula marginata 
Primula matthioli 
Primula maximowiczii 
Primula mazurenkoae 
Primula meadia 
Primula × media 
Primula megalocarpa 
Primula megaseifolia 
Primula meiantha 
Primula meiotera 
Primula melanantha 
Primula melanodonta 
Primula merrilliana 
Primula meyeri 
Primula mianyangensis 
Primula minima 
Primula minkwitziae 
Primula minor 
Primula minutissima 
Primula mishmiensis 
Primula mistassinica 
Primula miyabeana 
Primula modesta 
Primula mollis 
Primula monticola 
Primula × morissetii 
Primula morsheadiana 
Primula moupinensis 
Primula munroi 
Primula × murbeckii 
Primula × muretiana 
Primula muscarioides 
Primula muscoides 
Primula nana 
Primula nanocapitata 
Primula neurocalyx 
Primula nghialoensis 
Primula ninguida 
Primula nipponica 
Primula nivalis 
Primula normaniana 
Primula nutans 
Primula nutantiflora 
Primula obconica 
Primula obliqua 
Primula × obovata 
Primula obtusifolia 
Primula occlusa 
Primula odontica 
Primula odontocalyx 
Primula olgae 
Primula optata 
Primula orbicularis 
Primula oreodoxa 
Primula ovalifolia 
Primula oxygraphidifolia 
Primula palinuri 
Primula palmata 
Primula pamirica 
Primula parryi 
Primula partschiana 
Primula pauciflora 
Primula pauliana 
Primula pedemontana 
Primula pelargoniifolia 
Primula pellucida 
Primula pengzhouensis 
Primula persimilis 
Primula petelotii 
Primula petiolaris 
Primula petrocallis 
Primula pinnata 
Primula pinnatifida 
Primula poetica 
Primula poissonii 
Primula polonensis 
Primula poluninii 
Primula × polyantha 
Primula polyneura 
Primula praeflorens 
Primula praenitens 
Primula praetermissa 
Primula prenantha 
Primula prevernalis 
Primula primulina 
Primula prolifera 
Primula pseudodenticulata 
Primula pseudoelatior 
Primula pskemensis 
Primula × pubescens 
Primula pulchella 
Primula pulchra 
Primula pullulatrix 
Primula pulverulenta 
Primula pumilio 
Primula purdomii 
Primula pycnoloba 
Primula qiupuensis 
Primula ramzanae 
Primula ranunculoides 
Primula rebeccae 
Primula recubariensis 
Primula reflexa 
Primula reidii 
Primula reinii 
Primula renifolia 
Primula repentina 
Primula reptans 
Primula reticulata 
Primula rhodochroa 
Primula rimicola 
Primula rockii 
Primula rosea 
Primula rotundifolia 
Primula rubicunda 
Primula rubifolia 
Primula rugosa 
Primula runcinata 
Primula rupestris 
Primula rupicola 
Primula ruprechtii 
Primula rusbyi 
Primula russeola 
Primula × salomonii 
Primula sandemaniana 
Primula × santii 
Primula sapphirina 
Primula saturata 
Primula saxatilis 
Primula scandinavica 
Primula scapigera 
Primula schlagintweitiana 
Primula × schottii 
Primula sciophila 
Primula scopulicola 
Primula scotica 
Primula secundiflora 
Primula septemloba 
Primula serrata 
Primula sertulum 
Primula sessilis 
Primula sharmae 
Primula sherriffiae 
Primula siamensis 
Primula sieboldii 
Primula sikkimensis 
Primula silaensis 
Primula sinoexscapa 
Primula sinolisteri 
Primula sinomollis 
Primula sinoplantaginea 
Primula sinuata 
Primula siphonantha 
Primula smithiana 
Primula soldanelloides 
Primula sonchifolia 
Primula soongii 
Primula sorachiana 
Primula souliei 
Primula spathulifolia 
Primula spectabilis 
Primula specuicola 
Primula spicata 
Primula standleyana 
Primula × steinii 
Primula stenocalyx 
Primula stenodonta 
Primula stirtoniana 
Primula stricta 
Primula strumosa 
Primula stuartii 
Primula × sturii 
Primula subalpina 
Primula subpyrenaica 
Primula subularia 
Primula suffrutescens 
Primula sunhangii 
Primula szechuanica 
Primula takedana 
Primula taliensis 
Primula tangutica 
Primula tanneri 
Primula tanupoda 
Primula tardiflora 
Primula tayloriana 
Primula tenella 
Primula tenuiloba 
Primula tenuipes 
Primula tenuituba 
Primula tetrandra 
Primula thearosa 
Primula tibetica 
Primula tongolensis 
Primula tosaensis 
Primula tournefortii 
Primula tridentifera 
Primula triloba 
Primula tsariensis 
Primula tschuktschorum 
Primula tsiangii 
Primula tsongpenii 
Primula turkeviczii 
Primula tyrolensis 
Primula tzetsouensis 
Primula umbratilis 
Primula undulifolia 
Primula urticifolia 
Primula utahensis 
Primula vaginata 
Primula valentinae 
Primula valentiniana 
Primula × vallarsae 
Primula vallicola 
Primula × varians 
Primula veitchiana 
Primula × venusta 
Primula × venzoides 
Primula veris 
Primula verticillata 
Primula vialii 
Primula villosa 
Primula vilmoriniana 
Primula violacea 
Primula violaris 
Primula virginis 
Primula vulgaris 
Primula waddellii 
Primula walshii 
Primula waltonii 
Primula wangii 
Primula warshenewskiana 
Primula watsonii 
Primula wattii 
Primula wawushanica 
Primula × weldeniana 
Primula wenshanensis 
Primula × wettsteinii 
Primula whitei 
Primula wigramiana 
Primula wilsonii 
Primula wollastonii 
Primula woodwardii 
Primula woonyoungiana 
Primula wulfeniana 
Primula xanthopa 
Primula youngeriana 
Primula yunnanensis 
Primula yuparensis 
Primula zhui

References

Primula